Abdel Aziem Al-Afifi (~1971 – 11 July 2018) was an Egyptian-born Australian Sunni Islamic cleric and scholar, who was Grand Mufti of Australia from March 2018 until his death four months later in July.

Al-Afifi was born in Egypt, where he graduated with a degree in Islamic studies and a master's degree in Quranic recitations. He visited Australia in 2000 to conduct a Ramadan sermon, and decided to stay in Melbourne. He was a founding member of the Australian National Imams Council, and served as president of the council for two terms. In March 2018, Ibrahim Abu Mohamed stepped down as Grand Mufti after serving the constitutional maximum of two terms in the role, and Al-Afifi was elected as his replacement.

On 11 July 2018, it was announced that Al-Afifi had died of cancer at The Northern Hospital, Epping, aged 48.

References

Year of birth missing
1970s births
2018 deaths
Sunni Islamists
Grand Muftis of Australia
Australian imams
Australian people of Egyptian descent
Australian Islamists
Australian Sunni Muslim scholars of Islam
Egyptian Sunni Muslim scholars of Islam
Egyptian emigrants to Australia
Deaths from cancer in Victoria (Australia)